Subhash Rai is an Indian politician in the BJP. He was elected as a member of the Uttar Pradesh Legislative Assembly from Jalalpur on 24 October 2019.

References

Living people
Members of the Uttar Pradesh Legislative Assembly
Samajwadi Party politicians
Year of birth missing (living people)